The Greene Formation is a geologic formation in West Virginia, Ohio, Maryland, Virginia and Pennsylvania. It preserves fossils dating back to the Permian period.

See also

 List of fossiliferous stratigraphic units in West Virginia

References
 

Permian Maryland
Permian West Virginia
Permian Ohio
Permian geology of Pennsylvania
Permian geology of Virginia